Bastille Day or July 14 (French: Quatorze Juillet) is a 1933 French romantic comedy film directed by René Clair and starring Annabella, George Rigaud and Raymond Cordy.

It was made at the Epinay Studios by the French subsidiary of the German company Tobis. The film's art direction was by Lazare Meerson.

Plot
Anna, a flower-girl, is in love with Jean - a young taxi driver. Jean doesn't have the same feelings for Anna as he still thinks about Pola, who dumped him. Eventually, Jean asks Anna for a dance at to the ball, but all hell breaks loose when Pola shows up with two men who will stop at nothing to disturb this newly arising love.

Cast
Annabella as Anna  
George Rigaud as Jean  
Raymond Cordy as Jean's fellow cabbie  
Paul Ollivier as the tuxedoed drunk  
Raymond Aimos as Charles  
Thomy Bourdelle
Michel André 
Pola Illéry as Pola  
 as the tenant 
Gaston Modot

References

External links

1933 romantic comedy films
French romantic comedy films
Films directed by René Clair
Tobis Film films
Films set in Paris
Films shot at Epinay Studios
French black-and-white films
Holiday-themed films
1930s French-language films
1930s French films